The 2015 FIVB Women's Club World Championship was the 9th edition of the event. It was held in Zurich, Switzerland, from 6 to 10 May 2015. The Turkish club Eczacıbaşı VitrA won the championship.

Qualification

Pools composition

Squads

Venue

Pool standing procedure
Match won 3–0 or 3–1: 3 points for the winner, 0 points for the loser
Match won 3–2: 2 points for the winner, 1 point for the loser
In case of tie, the teams will be classified according to the following criteria:
number of matches won, sets ratio and points ratio

Preliminary round
All times are Central European Summer Time (UTC+2).

Pool A

|}

|}

Pool B

|}

|}

Final round
All times are Central European Summer Time (UTC+2).

Semifinals

|}

3rd place match

|}

Final

|}

Final standing

Awards

Most Valuable Player
 Jordan Larson ( Eczacıbaşı VitrA)
Best Opposite
 Olesia Rykhliuk ( Voléro Zürich)
Best Outside Spiker
 Tatiana Kosheleva ( Dinamo Krasnodar)
 Fernanda Garay ( Dinamo Krasnodar) 

Best Middle Blockers
 Maja Poljak ( Eczacıbaşı VitrA)
 Ana Carolina da Silva ( Rexona Ades Rio)
Best Setter
 Fabíola de Souza ( Dinamo Krasnodar)
Best Libero
 Silvija Popović ( Volero Zurich)

References

External links
Official Website of the 2015 FIVB Club World Championship

FIVB Volleyball Women's Club World Championship
2015 FIVB Women's Club World Championship
FIVB Women's Club World Championship
FIVB Women's Club World Championship
Sport in Zürich
21st century in Zürich
2015 in Swiss women's sport